Agdistis hulli is a moth in the family Pterophoridae. It is known from Greece (Dodecanese Islands, Aegean Islands). It was described from Lesbos.

References

Agdistinae
Moths of Europe
Moths described in 1998